Gosuke Yokota (September 23, 1880 – October 11, 1931) was the second Governor of the South Seas Mandate (1923–1931). He died in office. He was from Yamaguchi Prefecture. He was a graduate of the University of Tokyo.

1880 births
1931 deaths
Governors of the South Seas Mandate
Japanese Home Ministry government officials
University of Tokyo alumni
People from Yamaguchi Prefecture